The Maryland Black Bears are a Tier II junior ice hockey team in the North American Hockey League's East Division. The Black Bears play their home games in the Piney Orchard Ice Arena in Odenton, Maryland. Founded in 2018, the Black Bears are the first team in the 42-year history of the NAHL to be based out of Maryland.

Playing on the NHL-sized sheet of ice at the Piney Orchard Ice Arena, a former training center of the NHL's Washington Capitals, the Black Bears' organization has  exclusive use of over 7,000 square feet of space for locker rooms, training and equipment, offices, and workout areas. The organization also launched a team in the Tier III Eastern Hockey League, called Team Maryland, and several youth teams in the 2018–19 season, while also purchasing an ownership stake in the Tier I United States Hockey League's Youngstown Phantoms.

The Black Bears played their inaugural game on September 14, 2018, at Piney Orchard, losing 6–3 to the New Jersey Titans.

Season-by-season records

References

External links
Maryland Black Bears website
NAHL website

Ice hockey teams in Maryland
North American Hockey League
North American Hockey League teams
Ice hockey clubs established in 2018
2018 establishments in Maryland
Odenton, Maryland